Rahmat Hidayat (born 17 June 2003) is an Indonesian badminton player who is affiliated with the Djarum club.

Career

2020–2021 
Together with Rayhan Fadillah, they won their first junior tournament at the Dutch Junior International Grand Prix in 2020 after beating junior rivals Junaidi Arif and Muhammad Haikal. In that same year, Hidayat and Fadillah were also runners-up at the German Junior International, losing in the finals to their opponents whom they previously beaten in the Dutch Junior. 

In 2021, they were runners-up at the Denmark Junior International Series.

2022 
In June, Hidayat and Fadillah won their first senior title at the Lithuanian International. They also competed in the Indonesia International Challenge but were halted in the quarterfinals.

In October, Hidayat made a temporary partnership with Asian men's doubles champion Pramudya Kusumawardana following the injury of Yeremia Rambitan at the Malang Indonesia International. They managed to win the title at the first tournament together by defeating Japanese pair Hiroki Okamura and Masayuki Onodera. In the following week. they won the Indonesia Masters Super 100 by defeating 1st seed Chinese pair He Jiting and Zhou Haodong.

In late November, Hidayat back to his original partner, Fadillah, participated in Bahrain tournament and reach semi-finals of Bahrain International Series and won the Bahrain International Challenge.

2023 
In January, Hidayat and Fadillah played at the home tournament, Indonesia Masters, but had to lose in the qualifying round. In the next tournament, they lost in the quarter-finals of the Thailand Masters from 3rd seed fellow Indonesian pair Muhammad Shohibul Fikri and Bagas Maulana in rubber games.

Achievements

BWF World Tour (1 title)
The BWF World Tour, which was announced on 19 March 2017 and implemented in 2018, is a series of elite badminton tournaments sanctioned by the Badminton World Federation (BWF). The BWF World Tours are divided into levels of World Tour Finals, Super 1000, Super 750, Super 500, Super 300 (part of the HSBC World Tour), and the BWF Tour Super 100.

Men's doubles

BWF International Challenge/Series (3 titles) 
Men's doubles

  BWF International Challenge tournament
  BWF International Series tournament
  BWF Future Series tournament

BWF Junior International (1 title, 2 runners-up) 
Boys' doubles

  BWF Junior International Grand Prix tournament
  BWF Junior International Challenge tournament
  BWF Junior International Series tournament
  BWF Junior Future Series tournament

Performance timeline

Individual competitions

Senior level 
 Men's doubles

References

External links 
 

2003 births
Living people
People from Batam
Indonesian male badminton players
21st-century Indonesian people